Tregrug Castle or Llangibby Castle is a ruin in Monmouthshire, Wales, located about  to the north of the village of Llangybi, close to the settlement of Tregrug.

The castle appears to have superseded an earlier Norman motte-and-bailey castle, which is first mentioned in records dating from 1262. The bailey is entered through a gatehouse, to the left of which stands a large stone tower, known as the 'Lord's Tower'. Recent archaeological thinking suggests that the castle's main function may have been recreational rather than defensive; it was probably built as a hunting lodge, with accompanying gardens in the style of a late medieval ‘pleasance’. The castle had fallen into disuse by the 16th century but was refortified and garrisoned during the English Civil War. Slighted at the war's end, it was subsequently redeveloped as a landscape garden feature, to complement a new house, New Llangibby Castle, which was built in the grounds at the very end of the 17th century.

Name
The ruin is called by several different names, including Tregrug Castle (from the Welsh spelling of the nearest settlement), Tregruk Castle (English phonetic form) and Llangybi (or Llangibby) Castle. It is unclear whether the settlement of Tregrug was named after the hilltop structure, or the structure was named after the settlement.

History
The original castle on the site, a Norman motte-and-bailey to the east of the existing ruins, is first recorded in 1262. This castle was later superseded by the current structure. The estate, including the motte-and-bailey, came into the ownership of the  family in 1245, and was in possession of Bogo de Clare (1248-1294), the third son of Richard de Clare, for some years before his death. In 1369, the community of Tregrug was severely affected by one of the later outbreaks of the plague. A new ambitious noble residence, enclosed in a high stone wall, with defensive banks and ditches, was started in the early 14th century, probably by Gilbert de Clare. The castle passed briefly into the hands of the Despenser family; it may have been Hugh Despenser who began the construction of the late medieval structure from which most of the now-standing ruins derive. It was attacked during the revolt of Llywelyn Bren in 1316.

The historian John Kenyon has suggested that much of the later work at the castle may have been undertaken by Gilbert's widow, Matilda, and by his sister and heiress, Elizabeth de Burgh, after Gilbert's death at the Battle of Bannockburn in 1314. Kenyon supports the contention that the primary purpose of the castle was as a “grand country retreat or hunting lodge, albeit martial in appearance”, rather than a truly defensive structure.

Tregrug came into Crown ownership and was sold by Queen Mary to the Williams family of Usk in 1554. During the English Civil War the dilapidated castle was refortified and held by an influential local magnate, Sir Trevor Williams, 1st Baronet. At the end of the war, the castle was slighted.

In the late 17th  century, the Williams family built a new house nearby, known as New Llangibby Castle, adapted the castle ruins to a landscape garden feature and in around 1707 established an avenue of Scots Pines which ran from the gates of the estate to the River Usk. In the late-19th century, the motte was planted over with conifer trees and rhododendron, having previously been used as a bowling green. These were felled in the early 21st century, as were the softwood trees planted in the central enclosure, while New Llangibby Castle was demolished in 1951. The north and south stable ranges, both contemporaneous with the new house, remain and are Grade II listed buildings. The site is listed at Grade II on the Cadw/ICOMOS Register of Parks and Gardens of Special Historic Interest in Wales. Tregrug Castle, and the remnants of the original motte-and-bailey fortification, are scheduled monuments.

2010 archaeological investigation

In 2010, the remains at Tregrug were investigated by  television's Time Team. The archaeologists concluded that the banks and ditches surrounding the walls were almost entirely Civil War defences, and that the castle had been substantially remodelled in the later 17th century to provide a new main entrance, and to landscape the area inside the walls to form a garden. Some of the ruins became garden features, and others were removed to make way for the landscape garden and the carriage road. The archaeological team had available the extensive historical record of cost accounts from medieval Tregrug, which show expenses for elaborate gardening for the structure. The team concluded that the structure was primarily residential rather than defensive in purpose, a medieval ‘pleasance’ rather than a military castle.

Description
The site is broadly rectilinear. The bailey is entered through a "huge" gatehouse in the south-west corner, with two D-shaped towers, similar in design to the entrance tower at Beaumaris Castle. Turrets either side of the towers contain latrines. John Kenyon suggests that the high quality of the design and construction of these facilities, built in finely cut ashlar, is indicative of the domestic and recreational purposes of the castle. To the north-west stands the 'Lord's Tower', the only other tower still standing to any height. The curtain wall which surrounds the bailey is still largely intact.

Notes

References

Sources

External links
Llangibby Castle (Castell Tregrug) at Cadw
Llangybi Castle at the Castles of Wales site 
Llangybi Castle at the Gatehouse Gazetteer site
Llangibby House entry at Parks & Gardens UK
Llangybi Castle Estate records at the National Library of Wales

Castle ruins in Wales
Castles in Monmouthshire
Scheduled monuments in Monmouthshire
Registered historic parks and gardens in Monmouthshire